The governor of Tawi-Tawi, is the chief executive of the provincial government of Tawi-Tawi.

Provincial Governors (1987-2025)

References

Governors of Tawi-Tawi
Tawi-Tawi